Valley Township is a township in Hodgeman County, Kansas, USA.  As of the 2000 census, its population was 58.

Geography

The stream of Cottonwood Creek runs through this township.

References
 USGS Geographic Names Information System (GNIS)

External links
 US-Counties.com
 City-Data.com

Townships in Hodgeman County, Kansas
Townships in Kansas